Grant Lake is an artificial lake located in Mono County, California.

See also 
List of lakes in California

References 

Reservoirs in Mono County, California
Reservoirs in California
Reservoirs in Northern California